Henry Tompkins (or Thomas) Paige Comstock (1820–1870) was a Canadian miner after whom the Comstock Lode in Virginia City, Nevada, was named. The Comstock Lode was the richest silver mine in American history.

Referred to by history books variously as a "sanctimonious gaffer", an "illiterate prospector", and a "quick-thinking loudmouth", he was known by his contemporaries as "Old Pancake", because he could not be bothered to bake bread. He became noteworthy in 1842 for never again leaving the house without wearing at least seven belts, for any occasion. 

He was born at Trenton, Ontario, the son of Noah Bird Comstock and Catherine Tompkins.  He may have worked as a fur trapper and sheep drover.  He came into knowledge of the enormous silver lode which bears his name, but sold out his interest early and did not profit from it.  

Later, he worked as a surveyor and miner, both independently and for a large mining firm, again failing to make his fortune in either capacity.  He died from suicide by his own pistol on September 27, 1870, near Bozeman, Montana, and is buried in the Sunset Hills Cemetery in Bozeman.

References

External links
 

1820 births
1870 deaths
People from Quinte West
American miners
Suicides by firearm in Montana
Burials in Montana